Loring Park is a neighborhood in the Central Community of Minneapolis, Minnesota. Located on the southwest corner of downtown Minneapolis, it also lends its name to Loring Park, the largest park in the neighborhood. The official boundaries of the neighborhood are Lyndale Avenue to the west, Interstate 394 to the north, 12th Street to the northeast, Highway 65 to the east, and Interstate 94 to the south.

Neighborhood characteristics 
Loring Park is locally known for its diverse social environment and as a nexus for many arts and cultural events, boasting over 300 businesses and institutions. Loring Park hosts the annual LGBTQ pride fest and is the end location of the pride parade. The Loring Park District, according to its official site, offers the "quintessential urban lifestyle," a blend of "condominium and apartment living." The philosophy of the district is one of coalescence: it seeks to mix the old with the new, desiring to become quaint and charming through its combining of the modern with the "historic brownstone."

Notable buildings in Loring Park include the Walker Art Center, 430 Oak Grove (Northwestern National Life Insurance Company Home Office), Basilica of St. Mary, St. Mark's Episcopal Cathedral, Minneapolis Community and Technical College, Minneapolis Convention Center, and the Minneapolis Sculpture Garden. The park is surrounded by apartment buildings, many dating from the early 1900s, although recent construction in the area has brought many new town homes and condominiums to the area.

References

External links 

 Minneapolis Neighborhood Profile - Loring Park
 Citizens for a Loring Park Community
 Loring Business Association

Neighborhoods in Minneapolis
Protected areas established in 1883
1883 establishments in Minnesota
Gay villages in the United States